is a Japanese programming block on MBS. The programming block is set to run for one year and is a collaboration between MBS and Kadokawa's boys' love programming label, Tunku, to broadcast boys' love television drama series published by the latter. Drama Shower is broadcast on Fridays from 1:29 AM to 1:59 AM JST.

History

On March 4, 2022, Kadokawa Corporation announced their new boys' love drama label, Tunku. The label is produced by Kaoru Azuma, a long-time boys' love fan. As Kadokawa had previously published a variety of boys' love manga and novels, Tunku was created with the purpose of bringing live-action drama adaptations of them worldwide. The name "Tunku" was derived from the Japanese onomatopoeia of a beating heart and the label was named such to "deliver the excitement [of a beating heart] to viewers worldwide." Azuma stated that Kadokawa approved of Tunku immediately due to their familiarity with boys' love culture and they soon gained the interest and approval of MBS to broadcast their projects.

On the same day that Kadokawa announced the establishment of Tunku, MBS announced they were creating a programming block in collaboration with the label, titled Drama Shower, in which they would broadcast boys' love drama adaptations published under the Tunku label. Drama Shower would be broadcast every Friday from 1:29 AM to 1:59 AM JST for a limited run of one year. Azuma stated that despite Drama Shower running for one year, she would be interested in continuing Tunku after Drama Shower's end provided Kadokawa still has interest in the project. The first title announced for Drama Shower was Mr. Unlucky Has No Choice But to Kiss!, which began broadcast on April 22, 2022. Despite that the series came from a publisher outside of Kadokawa, Azuma wanted the adaptation to be the first series on Drama Shower because it was seen as accessible to newcomers of the boys' love genre and because it was a romantic comedy. It was followed by Senpai, This Can't Be Love!, Takara-kun & Amagi-kun, Eternal Yesterday, and Candy Color Paradox. In addition to the shows being serialized on Drama Shower, exclusive behind-the-scenes footage of all series would be uploaded onto Tunku's Niconico channel as the episodes aired.

Programming

 Mr. Unlucky Has No Choice But to Kiss!
 Senpai, This Can't Be Love!
 Takane-kun & Amagi-kun
 Eternal Yesterday
 Candy Color Paradox
 Jack Frost

Notes

References

Television programming blocks in Asia
Yaoi